Steve Bernier (born March 31, 1985) is a Canadian former professional ice hockey right winger. Selected in the first round, 16th overall, in the 2003 NHL Entry Draft by the San Jose Sharks, Bernier would play for the Sharks, Buffalo Sabres, Vancouver Canucks, Florida Panthers, New Jersey Devils and the New York Islanders during his time in the NHL.

Playing career

Junior
As a youth, Bernier played in the 1998 and 1999 Quebec International Pee-Wee Hockey Tournaments with a minor ice hockey team from Quebec City.

After capturing the 2001 Air Canada Cup, while being named Tournament MVP, with the Gouverneurs de Ste-Foy, Bernier was drafted first overall in the 2001 Quebec Major Junior Hockey League (QMJHL) Midget Draft. He played his entire four-season major junior career with the Moncton Wildcats. In his rookie year, he led Moncton in goals and finished fourth among QMJHL rookies in overall scoring; he was named to the 2001–02 QMJHL All-Rookie Team. His most productive junior season came in his draft year, 2002–03, when he scored 49 goals and 101 points, ninth in League scoring. He was named to the QMJHL Second All-Star Team.

Going into the 2003 NHL Entry Draft, the San Jose Sharks traded their 21st, 66th and 107th selections in exchange for the 16th overall position, with which they used to draft Bernier. Upon being drafted, Bernier played two more seasons with Moncton and was named once more to the QMJHL Second All-Star Team in 2003–04. Helping lead Moncton to the 2004 QMJHL Finals, he scored seven goals and ten assists in 20 playoff games. However, the Wildcats were eliminated by the Gatineau Olympiques in five games. In his fourth and final junior season, in 2004–05, Bernier tallied 71 points (tops in team scoring) and 114 penalty minutes in 68 games, but it marked the second-straight season his offensive output had dropped. Soon after being eliminated in the second round, the Sharks signed Bernier to his first professional contract, a three-year deal.

Professional

San Jose Sharks and Buffalo Sabres

Bernier split his first professional season, 2005–06, between the Sharks and their American Hockey League (AHL) affiliate, the Cleveland Barons. He scored 14 goals and added 13 assists in 39 games with the Sharks for a successful rookie season. His first NHL goal was scored on November 12, 2005, against Marty Turco of the Dallas Stars. In the 2006 playoffs, he added one goal and five assists in 11 games, as San Jose was eliminated in the second round.

Midway through his sophomore season, Bernier was sent back to the AHL after the Sharks suffered an 8–0 loss to the Phoenix Coyotes. However, Bernier soon broke his toe and missed a month's worth of games. After rehabilitation and ten games with Worcester (San Jose's new AHL affiliate), Bernier rejoined the Sharks in late February.

On February 26, at the 2007–08 trade deadline, Bernier was sent to the Buffalo Sabres, along with a first-round draft pick, in exchange for defenceman Brian Campbell and a seventh-round pick. The next day, in his Sabres debut, Bernier scored two goals on his first two shots and later added an assist, helping Buffalo to an 8–4 win over the Nashville Predators. At the time, Thomas Vanek wore number 26 for the Sabres, so Bernier chose the number 56 instead.

Vancouver Canucks

As Bernier became a restricted free agent at the end of the season, he was traded to the Vancouver Canucks in exchange for a second-round draft pick in 2010 and a third-round draft pick in 2009 (Los Angeles' selection). While Bernier was admittedly surprised with the trade, he expressed approval in moving to Vancouver. Four days later, he was extended a one-year, $2.5 million offer sheet by the St. Louis Blues, which the Canucks quickly matched. Playing in his first season with Vancouver, he injured both his left shoulder and left toe after missing a check on defenceman Brett Lebda and hitting the boards on November 24, 2008, against the Detroit Red Wings. However, he was only briefly sidelined and, setting career-highs in assists and points, he was awarded the Fred J. Hume Award as the team's unsung hero. Although Bernier was seen at the start of the season as a promising candidate for the Canucks' top line with the Henrik and Daniel Sedin, he settled into a third-line checking role with linemates Kyle Wellwood and Mason Raymond in the latter stages of the season.  Following the Canucks' second round elimination to the Chicago Blackhawks, Bernier was re-signed to a two-year, $4 million contract on May 14, 2009.

In preparation for the 2009–10 season, Bernier reported to training camp  lighter.

Florida Panthers
On June 25, 2010, during the 2010 NHL Entry Draft, Bernier was traded, along with Michael Grabner and the Canucks' first-round choice in the Draft (25th overall, used to select Quinton Howden), to the Florida Panthers in exchange for Keith Ballard and Victor Oreskovich. In November 2010, Bernier missed eight games with a right eye injury. Later in the season, he was placed on waivers by Florida on February 24, 2011, but went unclaimed. Remaining with Florida, he missed the final two games of the season with a shoulder injury, finishing with 15 points (five goals and ten assists) over 68 contests in 2010–11. Set to become a restricted free agent in the off-season, Florida chose not to tender Bernier a qualifying offer, giving him unrestricted status on July 1, 2011.

New Jersey Devils

Without a contract at the start of the NHL's training camp period, he was invited to the New Jersey Devils' training camp in September 2011. Within a month, he accepted an AHL contract with New Jersey's minor league affiliate, the Albany Devils. Bernier was later signed to a one-year, two way contract with the Devils on January 30, 2012.

In Game 6 of the 2012 Stanley Cup Finals, Bernier received a five-minute major penalty and a game misconduct for boarding after hitting Los Angeles Kings defenceman Rob Scuderi from behind with 9:50 remaining in the first period. The ensuing five-minute major penalty led to three Kings goals, including the Stanley Cup-winning goal (when a major penalty is assessed, the entire five-minute penalty must be served) and a commanding three-goal advantage over the Devils at the end of the first period. The Kings went on to win the game 6–1, clinching the series and winning the franchise its first Stanley Cup.

New York Islanders
After four seasons within the Devils organization Bernier left as a free agent, and approaching the 2015-16 season he signed a one-year contract with the New York Islanders on September 17, 2015. He'd appear in 24 games with the club, scoring 6 points. He spent the subsequent season with the team's AHL affiliate, the Bridgeport Sound Tigers.

On June 9, 2017, the team re-signed Bernier to a two-year, two-way contract.

Having conclude his contract with the Islanders following the 2018–19 season, Bernier as a free agent opted to continue within the Islanders organization by agreeing to return for his fourth season with the Bridgeport Sound Tigers on a one-year contract on July 11, 2019.

Retirement
Bernier would take on a player development role for the Wildcats, effectively ending his playing career.

International play

Bernier made his first international appearance at the 2001 World U-17 Challenge with Team Quebec. He tallied six points in six games; Quebec failed to medal.

At the under-18 level, he competed at the 2002 Eight Nations Tournament in Slovakia with Team Canada and captured gold. During his second year of major junior with Moncton, Bernier competed in the 2003 World U18 Championships in Russia. He captured his second-straight gold medal with Team Canada in a 3–0 win against Slovakia. He recorded eight points in seven games, finishing second in team scoring behind Marc-Antoine Pouliot.

Career statistics

Regular season and playoffs

International

Awards
Won the Air Canada Cup with the Gouverneurs de Ste-Foy in 2001.
Named Air Canada Cup MVP in 2001.
Named to the QMJHL All-Rookie Team in 2002.
Named to the CHL Second All-Star Team in 2003.
Named to the QMJHL Second All-Star Team in 2003 and 2004.
Won the Fred J. Hume Award (Vancouver Canucks' unsung hero) in 2009.

References

External links

1985 births
Living people
Albany Devils players
Bridgeport Sound Tigers players
Buffalo Sabres players
Canadian ice hockey right wingers
Cleveland Barons (2001–2006) players
Florida Panthers players
French Quebecers
Ice hockey people from Quebec City
Moncton Wildcats players
National Hockey League first-round draft picks
New Jersey Devils players
New York Islanders players
San Jose Sharks draft picks
San Jose Sharks players
Vancouver Canucks players
Worcester Sharks players